Mauricio Wiesenthal (born 1943 in Barcelona) is a Spanish writer. His works include fiction, biography, history, poetry, biography, literary and art criticism, including medicine and œnology.

In 1992, Mauricio Wiesenthal was awarded with the Gold Cup of the Oenologists of Catalonia.
Also awarded with the Gold Medal of Merit in the Fine Arts (Spain), in 2016.

Selected works
 The Belle Époque of the Orient-Express, Geocolor, 1979 (travel)
 Historia de la Fotografía, Salvat, 1979 (essay)
 Imagen de España, Salvat, 1984 (essay)
 Diccionario del Vino, Salvat, 2001 (oenology)
 El Gran Libro del Vino,Salvat, 2002 (oenology)
 Libro de Réquiems, Edhasa, 2004 (biography)
 Chandala Sutra, Altafulla, 2004 (poetry)
 La cata de Vinos, Alba Editorial, 2005 (essay)
 El esnobismo de las golondrinas, Edhasa, 2007 (fiction, travel)
 Luz de Vísperas, Edhasa, 2008 (novel)
 El viejo León, Tolstoi, un retrato literario, Edhasa, 2010 (biography, essay)
 Perdido en Poesía, Ediciones de la Isla de Siltolá, 2013 (poetry)
 Siguiendo mi camino, Acantilado 2013 (biography, essay)
 Rainer Maria Rilke, el vidente y lo oculto", Acantilado 2016 (biography, essay)
 Marrakech, fantasía en el palmeral, Editorial Trifolium, 2016 (travel)
 La hispanibundia. Retrato español de familia'', Acantilado, 2018 (essay)

References

External links 
 «Biografía», in mauriciowiesenthal.com.
 «Mauricio Wiesenthal», in lecturalia.com.
 Andalucia.diariocritico.com
 Mediterraneo Sur
 Ultima Hora
 20minutos.es

1943 births
Living people
Spanish male writers